The enzyme D-glutamate cyclase catalyzes the chemical reaction

D-glutamate  5-oxo-Dproline + H2O

This enzyme belongs to the family of lyases, specifically the hydro-lyases, which cleave carbon-oxygen bonds.  The systematic name of this enzyme class is D-glutamate hydro-lyase (cyclizing; 5-oxo-D-proline-forming). This enzyme is also called D-glutamate hydro-lyase (cyclizing).  This enzyme participates in D-glutamine and D-glutamate metabolism.

References

 

EC 4.2.1
Enzymes of unknown structure